The Utö Lighthouse is located on the island of Utö, in Pargas municipality, Finland. The  tower is situated on the island's summit. After the original round lighthouse (Finland's first lighthouse) was destroyed during the Russo-Swedish Wars of 1808-09, the present structure was constructed in 1814, with the present lens installed in 1906.

The lighthouse is painted as the signal flag H (Hotel), as the island has a maritime pilot station. Likewise, the light signal of the lighthouse is four short flashes (....) as Morse code letter 'H'.

References

Bibliography

External links

Lighthouses in Finland